David Leigh may refer to:

 David Leigh (journalist) (born 1946), British journalist and writer
 David Leigh (swimmer) (born 1956), British former swimmer
 David Leigh (scientist) (born 1963), professor of organic chemistry

See also

David Lee (disambiguation)